The 2021–22 Damehåndboldligaen (known as Bambusa Kvindeligaen for sponsorship reasons) was the 86th season of Damehåndboldligaen, Denmark's premier women's handball league. Odense Håndbold were the defending champions, while Ringkøbing Håndbold promoted from the 1. division.

Team information

Head coaches

Regular season

Standings

Season statistics

Top goalscorers

Regular season

Overall

Monthly awards

Number of teams by regions

References

External links
 Danish Handball Federaration 

Denmark
Handball
Handball
Damehåndboldligaen